Branch Rickey Arena is a 2,300-seat multi-purpose arena at Ohio Wesleyan University in Delaware, Ohio, located centrally on campus and adjacent to Edwards Gymnasium. It is home to the Wesleyan Battling Bishops basketball and volleyball teams.  It opened in June 1976, replacing Edwards Gymnasium, which was remodeled to become a full-time exercise facility.  It was named for the late Branch Rickey, Class of 1904, a major benefactor to the university and a manager of the Brooklyn Dodgers.

References

Ohio Wesleyan University buildings
College basketball venues in the United States
Basketball venues in Ohio
Indoor arenas in Ohio
1976 establishments in Ohio
Sports venues completed in 1976